Ryan Center is an 8,000-seat multi-purpose arena in Kingston, Rhode Island. The arena opened as a replacement for Keaney Gymnasium, which was built in 1953 for the needs of a much smaller student population at URI. It is home to the University of Rhode Island Rams basketball. The building is named for Thomas M. Ryan, Class of 1975, former CEO of Rhode Island-based CVS Pharmacy and lead benefactor of the arena.

The $54 million center opened in June 2002.  The first game in the arena was a women's basketball game against Kent State University on Nov. 22, 2002, and the first men's game was an upset win against USC on Nov. 26, 2002.

The building is recognizable for its three corner towers, which were modeled after lighthouses.  (The fourth corner would be where the building meets the Tootell Physical Education Center.) It stands directly next to Meade Stadium, and the original field house and west (visitor's side) grandstands were demolished to make way for the building. There are seven luxury boxes that can view both the basketball floor and the football stadium outside, and new grandstands were built in 2006.

The women's basketball team won the first-ever regular season game in the Ryan Center 53–39 over Kent State on Nov. 22, 2002 and four days later the men made their official debut in the building with a 73–71 overtime upset over the University of Southern California. Ever since, the Ryan Center has been a hard place for opponents to play, with the men's team drawing a standing room only crowd of 8,121 against No. 2-ranked Pittsburgh in 2002, and the women's team setting its attendance record with 3,402 fans against St. Bonaventure on Jan. 16. Both the men's and women's teams more than doubled their attendance from the last year in Keaney Gymnasium. 

With the opening of the Ryan Center, URI was able to move all of its games on campus for the first time since the 1970s.  The team had played occasional home games at the larger Amica Mutual Pavilion  since 1973.

The building
Rhode Island lighthouses were the inspiration for the design of the three towers, marking the North and South entrances of The Ryan Center. The interior reflects the warm earth tones to mimic the surrounding beach community.

The building also overlooks Meade Stadium, where the URI football team plays. The building serves as an indoor watching area, and has luxury boxes overlooking the field.

For the 2013–2014 season Rhode Island introduced a brand new basketball court named after the local jewelry company Alex and Ani.

As of January 16, 2019, the court has been renamed after the Rhode Island bank, BankRI.

In 2014 the Ryan Center upgraded to a larger HD scoreboard as well as LED panels around the upper deck.

Events
 Bellator 81
 AEW Battle of the Belts

See also
 List of NCAA Division I basketball arenas

References

External links
  Official Website

College basketball venues in the United States
Sports venues in Rhode Island
Indoor arenas in Rhode Island
Basketball venues in Rhode Island
Rhode Island Rams basketball venues
Sports venues in Washington County, Rhode Island
2002 establishments in Rhode Island